Pia Schmid is a Paralympian athlete from Switzerland competing mainly in category T52 sprint events.

She competed in the 1996 Summer Paralympics in Atlanta, United States.  There she finished seventh in the women's 200 metres - T51 event, finished seventh in the women's 400 metres - T51 event and finished seventh in the women's 800 metres - T51 event.  She also competed at the 2000 Summer Paralympics in Sydney, Australia.  There she finished fifth in the women's 100 metres - T52 event, finished eighth in the women's 200 metres - T52 event, finished eighth in the women's 400 metres - T52 event and finished eighth in the women's 800 metres - T52 event.  She also competed at the 2004 Summer Paralympics in Athens, Greece.    There she won a silver medal in the women's 200 metres - T52 event and finished fourth in the 400 metres.  She also competed in Beijing, China winning a bronze medal in the women's 200 metres - T52 event and finished fourth in the women's 100 metres - T52 event.

External links
 

Paralympic athletes of Switzerland
Athletes (track and field) at the 1996 Summer Paralympics
Athletes (track and field) at the 2000 Summer Paralympics
Athletes (track and field) at the 2004 Summer Paralympics
Athletes (track and field) at the 2008 Summer Paralympics
Paralympic silver medalists for Switzerland
Paralympic bronze medalists for Switzerland
Swiss female wheelchair racers
Living people
Medalists at the 2004 Summer Paralympics
Medalists at the 2008 Summer Paralympics
Year of birth missing (living people)
Paralympic medalists in athletics (track and field)